ID3 is a metadata container most often used in conjunction with the MP3 audio file format. It allows information such as the title, artist, album, track number, and other information about the file to be stored in the file itself.

ID3 is a de facto standard for metadata in MP3 files; no standardization body was involved in its creation nor has such an organization given it a formal approval status. It competes with the APE tag in this arena.

There are two unrelated versions of ID3: ID3v1 and ID3v2. In ID3v1 the metadata is stored  in a 128-byte segment at the end of the file. There are variations of ID3v1 extending the specification with new fields such as v1.1's "track number" field at the expense of a slight shortening of the "comment" field. 

ID3v2 is structurally very different from ID3v1, consisting of an extensible set of "frames" located at the start of the file. 83 types of frames are declared in the ID3v2.4 specification, and applications can also define their own types. There are standard frames for containing cover art, BPM, copyright and license, lyrics, and arbitrary text and URL data, as well as other things. Three versions of ID3v2 have been documented, each of which has extended the frame definitions.

Lyrics3v1 and Lyrics3v2 were tag standards implemented before ID3v2, for adding lyrics to mp3 files. The difference with ID3v2 is that Lyrics3 is always at the end of an MP3 file, before the ID3v1 tag.

ID3v1 

The MP3 standard did not include a method for storing file metadata. In 1996 Eric Kemp had the idea to add a small chunk of data to the audio file, thus solving the problem. The method, now known as ID3v1, quickly became the de facto standard for storing metadata in MP3s.

The ID3v1 tag occupies 128 bytes, beginning with the string TAG 128 bytes from the end of the file. The tag was placed at the end of the file to maintain compatibility with older media players. If a player does not recognize the tag it would play a small burst of static instead of ignoring it. This tag allows 30 bytes each for the title, artist, album, and a "comment", four bytes for the year, and a byte to identify the genre of the song from a predefined list of 80 values (Winamp later extended this list to 148 values).

One improvement to ID3v1 was made by Michael Mutschler in 1997. Since the comment field was too small to write anything useful, he decided to trim it by two bytes and use those two bytes to store the track number. Such tags are referred to as ID3v1.1.

ID3v1 and ID3v1.1 
Strings are either space- or zero-padded. Unset string entries are filled using an empty string. ID3v1 is 128 bytes long.

ID3v1 pre-defines a set of genres denoted by numerical codes. Winamp extended the list by adding more genres in its own music player, which were later adopted by others. However, support for the extended Winamp list is not universal. In some cases, only the genres up to 125 are supported.

Enhanced TAG 
The Enhanced tag is an extra data block before an ID3v1 tag, which extends the title, artist and album fields to 60 bytes each, offers a freetext genre, a one-byte (values 0–5) speed and the start and stop time of the music in the MP3 file, e.g., for fading in. If none of the fields are used, it will be automatically omitted.

Some programs supporting ID3v1 tags can read the extended tag, but writing may leave stale values in the extended block. The extended block is not an official standard and had low adoption. The Enhanced tag is sometimes referred to as the "extended" tag.

The Enhanced tag is 227 bytes long, and placed before the ID3v1 tag.

ID3v1.2 
ID3v1.2 made small improvements to ID3v1.1 without breaking compatibility with it.

ID3v2 

In 1998, a new specification called ID3v2 was created by multiple contributors. Although it bears the name ID3, its structure is very different from ID3v1.

ID3v2 tags are of variable size, and usually occur at the start of the file, which aids streaming media as the metadata is essentially available as soon as the file starts streaming instead of requiring the entire file to be read first as is the case with ID3v1. ID3v2 tags consist of a number of frames, each of which contains a piece of metadata. For example, the TIT2 frame contains the title, and the WOAR frame contains the URL of the artist's website. Frames can be up to 16 MB in length, while total tag size is limited to 256MB. The internationalization problem was solved by allowing the encoding of strings not only in ISO-8859-1, but also in Unicode. Textual frames are marked with an encoding byte.

There are 83 types of frames declared in the ID3v2.4 specification, and applications can also define their own types. There are standard frames for containing cover art, copyright and license, lyrics, and arbitrary text and URL data, as well as other things.

There are three versions of ID3v2:

ID3v2.2 was the first public version of ID3v2. It used three character frame identifiers rather than four (TT2 for the title instead of TIT2). Most of the common v2.3 and v2.4 frames have direct analogues in v2.2. It is now considered obsolete.

ID3v2.3 expanded the frame identifier to four characters, and added a number of frames. This is the most widely used version of ID3v2 tags, and is widely supported by Windows Explorer and Windows Media Player.

ID3v2.4 was published on November 1, 2000. It allows text frames to contain multiple values, separated with a null byte. Textual data to be encoded in UTF-8 rather than UTF-16. Another new feature allows the addition of a tag to the end of the file before other tags (like ID3v1).

ID3v2 chapters 
The ID3v2 Chapter Addendum was published in December 2005. It allows users to jump easily to specific locations or chapters within an audio file and can provide a synchronized slide show of images and titles during playback. Typical use-cases include Enhanced podcasts and it can be used in ID3v2.3 or ID3v2.4 tags.

ID3v2 embedded image extension 
The metadata can contain an "Attached Picture" ID3 frame ('PIC' or 'APIC') containing an image. A field in this frame can indicate the picture type.

Editing ID3 tags 

ID3 tags may be edited in a variety of ways. On some platforms the file's properties may be edited by viewing extended information in the file manager. Additionally most audio players allow editing single or groups of files. Editing groups of files is often referred to as "batch tagging". There are also specialized applications, called taggers, which concentrate specifically on editing the tags and related tasks.

Non-MP3-implementation and alternatives 
ID3 tags were designed with MP3 in mind, so they would work without problems with MP3 and MP3Pro files. However, the tagsets are an independent part of the MP3 file and can be used elsewhere. In practice, the only other formats that widely use ID3v2 tags are AIFF and WAV. In AIFF, the tag is stored inside an IFF chunk named "ID3". Windows media ASF files (WMA, WMV) have their own tagging formats but also support ID3 Tags embedded as attributes.

MP4 also allows the embedding of an ID3 tag.

See also 
 CD-Text
 Vorbis comment
 Standard Architecture for Universal Comment Extensions (SAUCE)
 XBin (eXtended Binary)

Notes

References

External links 
 
 List of genres in ID3v1
 ID3v1 Specification
 Side-by-side Comparison of ID3 Versions and Frames
 

Computer file formats
Metadata standards